The 1948 Alberta general election was held on August 17, 1948, to elect members of the Legislative Assembly of Alberta.

Ernest C. Manning led the Social Credit to a fourth term in government, increasing its share of the popular vote further above the 50% mark it had set in the 1944 election. It won the same number of seats — 51 of the 57 seats in the legislature — that it had won in the previous election.

The remaining seats were won by the Cooperative Commonwealth Federation, the Liberal Party and independents.

This provincial election, like the previous five, saw district-level proportional representation (Single transferable voting) used to elect the MLAs of Edmonton and Calgary. City-wide districts were used to elect multiple MLAs in the cities. All the other MLAs were elected in single-member districts through Instant-runoff voting. 

Along with this election, voters got to also vote in a province wide plebiscite. The ballot asked voters about utility regulation.

Results

Note:

* Party did not nominate candidates in the previous election.

Electrification plebiscite
The electrification plebiscite was the fourth plebiscite conducted province-wide in Alberta's history. The ballot was not a traditional yes/no question, but presented two options on electricity generation and transmission, asking if the province should create "a publicly-owned utility administered by the Alberta Government Power Commission" or leave the electricity industry in the hands of companies already in the business (a mixture of municipal operations and private companies). The driving force behind the referendum was whether to provide rural electrification through public ownership or leave it in the hands of private corporations that had done very little up to that time and did not have the financial resources to perform the task. Despite the referendum result, the government sponsored the creation of many Rural Electrification Associations, of which some still exist today.

The result shows how evenly divided the province was on the issue, with a plurality of only 151 votes in favour of leaving the old system in place. In fact, the majority of voters in Edmonton and in the rural areas were in favour of provincial control but an even larger majority in Calgary voted in favour of the old system.

For a breakdown of results, please see individual districts.

Members elected
For complete electoral history, see individual districts.

See also
1957 Liquor Plebiscite
1967 Daylight Saving Plebiscite
1971 Daylight Saving Plebiscite
List of Alberta political parties

References

Alberta general election
1948
General election
Alberta general election